The 1996–97 AHL season was the 61st season of the American Hockey League. The league renames its divisions due to relocating teams. The Northern Conferences consists of the Atlantic Division becoming the Canadian Division, and the Central Division becoming the Empire State Division. The Southern Conferences consists of the North Division becoming the New England Division, and the South Division becoming the Mid-Atlantic Division.

Eighteen teams played 80 games each in the schedule. The Philadelphia Phantoms finished first overall in the regular season. The Hershey Bears won their eighth Calder Cup championship.

Team changes
 The Prince Edward Island Senators suspend operations, becoming dormant.
 The Cornwall Aces suspend operations, becoming dormant.
 The Cape Breton Oilers move to Hamilton, Ontario, becoming the Hamilton Bulldogs, playing in the Canadian division.
 The Kentucky Thoroughblades join the AHL as an expansion team, based in Lexington, Kentucky, playing in the Mid-Atlantic division.
 The Philadelphia Phantoms join the AHL as an expansion team, based in Philadelphia, Pennsylvania, playing in the Mid-Atlantic division.
 The Binghamton Rangers switch from the South division to the Empire State division.

Final standings 
Note: GP = Games played; W = Wins; L = Losses; T = Ties; OTL = Overtime losses; GF = Goals for; GA = Goals against; Pts = Points;

Northern Conference

Southern Conference

Scoring leaders

Note: GP = Games played; G = Goals; A = Assists; Pts = Points; PIM = Penalty minutes

 complete list

Calder Cup playoffs

All Star Classic 
The 10th AHL All-Star Game was played on January 16, 1997, at the Harbour Station in Saint John, New Brunswick. Team World defeated Team Canada 3–2 in a shootout. In the skills competition held the day before the All-Star Game, Team World won 18–9 over Team Canada.

Trophy and award winners

Team awards

Individual awards

Other awards

See also 
 List of AHL seasons

References 
 AHL official site
 AHL Hall of Fame
 HockeyDB

  
American Hockey League seasons
2
2